Thomas Judy (December 19, 1804 – October 4, 1879) was an American politician.

The son of Samuel Judy, Judy lived in Edwardsville, Illinois. Thomas Judy served in the Illinois House of Representatives in 1852–1853.

Notes

1804 births
1879 deaths
People from Edwardsville, Illinois
Members of the Illinois House of Representatives
American people of Swiss descent
19th-century American politicians